The TM-57 mine is a large, circular Soviet metal-cased blast anti-tank mine. It can either be triggered by a pressure or a tilt-rod fuze. A development of the TM-46 mine, it is found in Africa, the Middle East, and South East Asia.

Description
The TM-57 has a larger main charge and improved fuzing compared to the earlier TM-46. It is circular with a metal case and a central fuze well. A secondary pull-action fuze MUV-2 (Rus. МУВ-2) or VPF (Rus. ВПФ) pull and tilt fuze can be fitted on the side of the mine, which serves as an anti-handling device. The tilt rod fuze gives the mine improved resistance to blast; it is activated when it is forced to a deflection of 25 to 30 degrees. A training version of the mine that produces smoke is designated the TM-60.

Specifications
Diameter: 316 mm
Height: 102 mm
Operating pressure: 120–400 kg or 21 kg tilt.
Weight: 8.47 kg
Explosive content: 6.34 kg of TNT, TGA (RDX/TNT/Aluminium) or MS (RDX/TNT/Aluminium/Wax) 
Fuse:
 MVZ-57 pressure.
 MVSh-57 tilt with MD019 detonator.

See also
TM-46 mine, predecessor.
Anti-tank mine
Land mine

Anti-tank mines
Land mines of the Soviet Union